Y.O.U.N.G are an English alternative/rock/rap band originating from Mottram,a small town on the hilly outskirts of Manchester. The band consists of vocalist songwriter and lead guitarist Chez Davis, rhythm guitarist and producer Jamie Skehan, Rapper AntiCalm and bassist Tom Whitehead.

History

Early career 
Lead vocalist Chez Davis had spent time crafting song ideas with Jamie Skehan following the break up of his teenage pop punk band Outrage, with Ben Donaldson added after a chance meeting with his uncle, the dancer Clive 'Wiggy' Donaldson from the ITV Granada series The Hitman and Her.

The three-piece was known as LoudKidz. They had multiple YouTube singles such as 'Crazy Girls' & 'FriendZone'. They became more popular when their video titled 'The Curry Rap' got over nearly two million views in a couple of hours on the Facebook page 'LadBible'. In August–September 2015 they joined Australian YouTube comedy group The Janoskians on a European tour, gaining more fans.

Formation and early beginnings
In December 2016 they announced their name change and new direction. LoudKidz was now known as Y.O.U.N.G and gained two new members: drummer Graeme Smith and bassist Tom Whitehead. Their debut single, "What I Gotta Do" was released in February 2017.

Their first live performance together as a five-piece was at Manchester music venue Sound Control.

2017-2018
After locking themselves away in the studio in Stalybridge, recording and producing the music themselves with help from Dave Pemberton (The Prodigy, Kinobe, Groove Armada) to finalise mixes for their ever growing catalogue of songs. The band self released their first song "What I Gotta Do" on independent record label Beautiful Noise Records (PIAS Distribution).

The band completed their debut headline UK tour in late 2017, and supported Irish rock band The Script at Scarborough Open Air Theatre, North Yorkshire on 21 June 2018, before playing two dates with Emeli Sandé at London's Greenwich Music Time, and Scarborough Open Air Theatre.

2019-present 
In 2019 they revealed their new sound by releasing their new single "Bright Lights". Their statement single, "Feels" followed in August 2019. In September 2019, the band flew to Los Angeles to work with the record producer Brandon Friesen and DJ Lethal. Whilst there, the band reached a milestone and performed their first US show at The Viper Room, previously owned by Johnny Depp.

Discography

Singles

References

English pop rock music groups